The afterlife refers to a belief in life after death.

Afterlife or after life may also refer to:

Literature
 Afterlife, a 1985 book on psychic research by Colin Wilson
 Afterlife (comics), a 2006 manga by Stormcrow Hayes and Rob Steen
 Afterlife (play), a 2008 play by Michael Frayn on the life of Max Reinhardt, founder of the Salzburg Festival
 "Afterlife" (short story), a 2013 short story by Stephen King

Novels
 Afterlife, a 1990 novel by Paul Monette 
 The Afterlife, a 2005 novel by Gary Soto
 Afterlife, a 2009 novel by Sean O'Brien
 Afterlife (Gray novel), a 2011 novel in the Evernight series by Claudia Gray
 Afterlife, a 2014 novel by Dee Shulman
 Afterlife, a 2020 novel by Julia Alvarez

Film and TV

Film
 Afterlife (1978 film), an animated short by Ishu Patel
 After Life (film), a 1998 Japanese drama film
 AfterLife (film), a 2003 UK drama film
 After.Life, a 2009 American psychological horror film
 Resident Evil: Afterlife, a 2010 horror film
 Afterlife (2014 film), a Hungarian film directed by Virág Zomborácz
 Ghostbusters: Afterlife, a 2021 American supernatural comedy film

Television 
 Afterlife (TV series), a 2005 British television drama series
 The Afterlife with Suzane Northrop, or The Afterlife, a 2008 Canadian documentary television series
 After Life (TV series), a 2019–2022 British streaming television series

Episodes 
 "After Life" (Buffy the Vampire Slayer)
 "After Life" (St. Elsewhere)
 "Afterlife" (The Outer Limits)
 "Afterlife" (Agents of S.H.I.E.L.D.)
 "The Afterlife" (Traders)
 "After Life", an episode of Night Visions
 "The Afterlife", an episode of Sci Fi Investigates

Video games 
 Afterlife (video game), a 1996 simulation game by LucasArts
 Wraith: The Oblivion – Afterlife, a 2021 horror game by Fast Travel Games

Music

Albums
 Afterlife (Joe Jackson album), 2004
 Afterlife (Nocturnal Rites album), or the title song, 2000
 Afterlife, by Disco Ensemble, 2017
 Afterlife, by DJ Rashad, 2016
 Afterlife, by Light Years, 2018
 AfterLife (Five Finger Death Punch album), or the title song, 2022
 The Afterlife, by the Comet Is Coming, 2019

EPs
 Afterlife (EP), by Global Goon, or the title song, 1997
 After Life, by Tchami, or the title song, 2015

Songs
 "Afterlife" (Arcade Fire song), 2013
 "Afterlife" (Avenged Sevenfold song), 2007
 "Afterlife" (Bush song), 2010
 "Afterlife" (Hailee Steinfeld song), 2019
 "The Afterlife", by Paul Simon, 2011
 "Afterlife", by Amaranthe from The Nexus, 2013
 "Afterlife", by Betraying the Martyrs from Phantom, 2014
 "Afterlife", by Dream Theater from When Dream and Day Unite, 1989
 "Afterlife", by Front Line Assembly from Improvised Electronic Device, 2010
 "Afterlife", by Future and Juice Wrld from Wrld on Drugs, 2018
 "Afterlife", by Gothminister from Utopia, 2014
 "Afterlife", by Greyson Chance from Somewhere Over My Head, 2016
 "Afterlife", by Ingrid Michaelson from Lights Out, 2014
 "Afterlife", by Nothing but Thieves from Broken Machine, 2017
 "Afterlife", by Switchfoot from Vice Verses, 2011
 "Afterlife", by Testament from The Formation of Damnation, 2008
 "After Life", by Band-Maid from Unseen World, 2021
 "The Afterlife", by Borealis from World of Silence, 2008

See also 

 After death (disambiguation)
 Life after death (disambiguation)
 Life After Life (disambiguation)
 Resurrection of the dead
 World to come